Sukhi Sewaniya is a village in the Bhopal district of Madhya Pradesh, India. It is located in the Huzur tehsil and the Phanda block. Located near the Bhopal Bypass road, it has gradually developed into a suburb of the Bhopal city.

History 

The name Sukhi Sewaniya is Hindi for "dry oats". The name was given by the local people as the area consist of dry grass land looking exactly like dry oat fields. The people now also often call the region as Sookhi Simaiyaan. Sukhsewanagar ("Pleasure and Service City") is a later adaptation of the original name.

The village was established in 1958.

Demographics 

According to the 2011 census of India, Sukhi Sewaniya has 535 households. The effective literacy rate (i.e. the literacy rate of population excluding children aged 6 and below) is 64.29%.

Economy 

The village is famous for its agro-based factories and industries. It is one of the leading and second largest industrial area in Bhopal City after Mandideep.

Transport 

The Sukhisewaniyan railway station is located in the village.  It is situated on Bhopal–Bina railway line, and the following trains stop here:
Bhopal–Bilaspur Express
(Bhopal–Bina–Katni–Bilaspur)
Bhopal–Bina
(Bhopal-Vidisha-Bina)
Jhansi–Itarsi
Passenger   (Agra–Gwalior–Jhansi–Bina–Bhopal–Itarsi)
Bhopal–Jodhpur Passenger
(Bhopal–Bina–Guna–Kota–Jaipur–Jodhpur)

Raja Bhoj Airport at Bairagarh, Bhopal is the nearest airport.  Inter-state and Inter-city highway connect the village to other places such as Jhansi, Sagar, Sanchi and Guna. There is a direct bus from Sukhi Sewaniya to Halalpura bus stand in Bhopal, which connects it to Nagpur, Indore, Ahmedabad, Raisen, Jaipur, Hoshangabad and Jabalpur.

References 

Villages in Huzur tehsil